The UAAP Season 77 seniors' division volleyball tournament started on November 22, 2014 at the Mall of Asia Arena in Pasay, Metro Manila. Opening-day games were the women's teams of UE vs UST at 2 PM and Ateneo vs NU at 4 PM. The tournament main venue was the Filoil Flying V Arena in  San Juan City while selected games will be played at the Smart Araneta Coliseum in Cubao, Quezon City, and the Mall of Asia Arena in Pasay.

The UAAP Season 77 high school volleyball tournament started on July 26, 2014. The tournament venue was the Adamson University Gym in San Marcelino St., Ermita, Manila. The number of participating schools in the boys' and girls' tournaments both increased to seven. Far Eastern University fielded boys' and girls' volleyball teams this season. Since there are now seven participating schools, the tournaments will have a Final Four format.

Men's tournament

Elimination round

Team standings

Event host in boldface.

Point system:
 3 points = win match in 3 or 4 sets
 2 points = win match in 5 sets
 1 point  = lose match in 5 sets
 0 point  = lose match in 3 or 4 sets

Match-up results

Game results 
Results to the right and top of the gray cells are first round games, those to the left and below are second round games.

Bracket

Semifinals

Ateneo vs Adamson

UST vs NU

Finals

Awards 

 Most Valuable Player (Season): Marck Jesus Espejo (Ateneo de Manila University)
 Most Valuable Player (Finals): Esmilzo Joner Polvorosa (Ateneo de Manila University)
 Rookie of the Year: Edward Camposano (University of the East)
 Best Scorer: Mark Gil Alfafara (University of Santo Tomas)
 Best Attacker: Marck Jesus Espejo (Ateneo de Manila University)
 Best Blocker: Peter Den Mar Torres (National University)
 Best Setter: Esmilzo Joner Polvorosa (Ateneo de Manila University)
 Best Digger: Rence Melgar (Adamson University)
 Best Receiver: Rence Melgar (Adamson University)
 Best Server: Vincent Mangulabnan (National University)

Women's tournament

Elimination round

Team standings

Event host in boldface.

Point system:
 3 point = win match in 3 or 4 sets
 2 points = win match in 5 sets
 1 point  = lose match in 5 sets
 0 point  = lose match in 3 or 4 sets

Match-up results

Game results 
Results to the right and top of the gray cells are first round games, those to the left and below are second round games.

Bracket

Fourth–seed playoff

First round

Semifinals 
La Salle has the twice-to-beat advantage.

Finals 

Elimination round games:
 January 11: Ateneo (3-2) La Salle at the Mall of Asia Arena (25-22, 25-27, 16-25, 25-14, 15-9)
 February 18: Ateneo (3-1) La Salle at the Mall of Asia Arena (25-20, 21-25, 25-23, 27-25)
Ateneo has the thrice-to-beat advantage after sweeping the elimination round.

Awards

 Most Valuable Player (Season): Alyssa Valdez (Ateneo de Manila University)
 Most Valuable Player (Finals): Rongomaipapa Amy Ahomiro (Ateneo de Manila University)
 Rookie of the Year: Kathleen Faith Arado (University of the East) and Ennajie Laure (University of Santo Tomas)
 Best Scorer: Alyssa Valdez (Ateneo de Manila University)
 Best Attacker: Alyja Daphne Santiago (National University)
 Best Blocker: Marivic Velaine Meneses (University of Santo Tomas)
 Best Server: Alyssa Valdez (Ateneo de Manila University)
 Best Setter: Julia Melissa Morado (Ateneo de Manila University)
 Best Receiver: Dennise Michelle Lazaro (Ateneo de Manila University)
 Best Digger: Christine Agno (Far Eastern University)

Boys' tournament

Elimination round

Team standings

Match-up results

Bracket

Awards

 Most Valuable Player: Ron Adrian Medalla (University of the East)
 Rookie of the Year: Raymart Reyes (National University)
 Best Attacker: Joshua Umandal (University of the East)
 Best Blocker: Gian Carlo Glorioso (Ateneo de Manila University)
 Best Server: Sebastian Enrique Cuerva (Ateneo de Manila University)
 Best Setter: Adrian Rafael Imperial (University of the East)
 Best Receiver: Dazyl June Cayamso (National University)
 Best Libero: Ralph Ryan Imperial (University of the East)

Girls' tournament

Elimination round

Team standings

Match-up results

Bracket

Awards

 Most Valuable Player: Faith Janine Shirley Nisperos (National University)
 Rookie of the Year: Rachelle Anne Fabro (Far Eastern University)
 Best Attacker: Ejiya Laure (University of Santo Tomas)
 Best Blocker: Pauline Marie Monique Gaston (University of Santo Tomas)
 Best Server: Jennifer Nierva (National University)
 Best Setter: Rica Diolan (National University)
 Best Receiver: Mildred Dizon (De La Salle University)
 Best Digger: Kristine Magallanes (National University)

Overall championship points

Seniors' division

Juniors' division

In case of a tie, the team with the higher position in any tournament is ranked higher. If both are still tied, they are listed by alphabetical order.

How rankings are determined:
 Ranks 5th to 8th determined by elimination round standings.
 Loser of the #1 vs #4 semifinal match-up is ranked 4th
 Loser of the #2 vs #3 semifinal match-up is ranked 3rd
 Loser of the finals is ranked 2nd
 Champion is ranked 1st

See also
 UAAP Season 77

References

2013 in Philippine sport
2014 in Philippine sport
2013 in volleyball
2014 in volleyball
UAAP Season 77
UAAP volleyball tournaments